Oleksandr Zinenko (born 24 February 1979) is a Ukrainian sports shooter. He competed in the men's 10 metre running target event at the 2000 Summer Olympics.

References

External links
 

1979 births
Living people
Ukrainian male sport shooters
Olympic shooters of Ukraine
Shooters at the 2000 Summer Olympics
Sportspeople from Kryvyi Rih